Keosaychay Sayasone (11 September 1958 – 4 April 2021) was the wife of former Lao President Choummaly Sayasone and the First Lady of Laos from 2006 to 2016.

She died on 4 April 2021, by drowning when a yacht she was on capsized in Nam Ngum Lake.

References

First ladies of Laos
1958 births
2021 deaths
Boating accident deaths